Nicholas "Nels" Podolsky, also spelled Podolski, (December 18, 1923 – March 21, 2007) was a Canadian professional ice hockey left winger who played in one regular season and seven playoff games in the National Hockey League with the Detroit Red Wings during the 1948–49 season. Podolsky was born in Winnipeg, Manitoba. He died at Sault Ste. Marie in 2007.

Career statistics

Regular season and playoffs

References

External links
 

1923 births
2007 deaths
Canadian expatriates in the United States
Canadian ice hockey right wingers
Detroit Red Wings players
Edmonton Flyers (WHL) players
Galt Red Wings players
Ice hockey people from Ontario
Ontario Hockey Association Senior A League (1890–1979) players
Omaha Knights (USHL) players
St. Louis Flyers players
Sault Ste. Marie Greyhounds players
Shawinigan-Falls Cataracts (QSHL) players
Sherbrooke Saints players
Ice hockey people from Winnipeg
Troy Bruins players